Stockton Township is one of fifteen townships in Greene County, Indiana, USA.  As of the 2010 census, its population was 8,447.

Geography
Lakes in this township include Boy Scout Pond. The stream of Willow Slough runs through this township.

Cities and towns
 Linton

Unincorporated towns
 Ellis
 Hoosier
 Island City
 Sponsler
 Summit
 Victoria
 White Rose
(This list is based on USGS data and may include former settlements.)

Adjacent townships
 Wright Township (north)
 Smith Township (northeast)
 Grant Township (east)
 Washington Township (southeast)
 Stafford Township (south)
 Jefferson Township, Sullivan County (southwest)
 Cass Township, Sullivan County (northwest)

Cemeteries
The township contains six cemeteries: Clayton, Fairview, German, Island City, Old Linton and Richards.

Major highways

Education
Stockton Township residents may obtain a free library card from the Linton Public Library in Linton.

References
 U.S. Board on Geographic Names (GNIS)
 United States Census Bureau cartographic boundary files

External links
 Indiana Township Association
 United Township Association of Indiana

Townships in Greene County, Indiana
Bloomington metropolitan area, Indiana
Townships in Indiana